Erhan Tabakoğlu (born 1967 in Kırklareli in the Province of Kırklareli) is a Turkish professor of medicine at Trakya University. He was elected as the new rector of the university on 12 July 2016 by a majority vote, and at the end of July the election was confirmed. He defeated the incumbent rector Yener Yörük, who was also a candidate. In 2020, Tabakoglu was confirmed as rector for a second term until 2024.

Life and work
Tabakoglu was born in 1967 and attended primary and secondary school in Alpulla and took school leaving examinations in Edirne. He then studied medicine at Istanbul University and performed his two-year military service in Adana.

Tabakoglu began his career at the Trakya University Clinic for Lung Disease in 1992, and in 2005 he became an associate professor. He has been professor of intensive care at the clinic since 2012.

The revitalisation of international relations by Trakya University is most important to Erhan Tabakoglu. In particular he supports the Balkan Universities Network in that his rectorship has taken over as secretary-general of this network. He is strongly supported in this by Hilmi Ibar.

Tabakoglu is married and has two children.

External links 
Scientific publications Erhan Tabakoglu
Candidate in the election to rector Erhan Tabakoglu

References 

1967 births
Living people
Academic staff of Trakya University
Rectors of universities and colleges in Turkey